Robin Croker (born 10 May 1954) is a cyclist born in Melbourne, Australia to British parents. He won a bronze medal riding for Great Britain in the team pursuit at the 1976 Montreal Games. Croker also rode for Australia in 1974 British Commonwealth Games (Road).

References

1954 births
Living people
English male cyclists
Cyclists at the 1976 Summer Olympics
Olympic cyclists of Great Britain
Olympic bronze medallists for Great Britain
Olympic medalists in cycling
Medalists at the 1976 Summer Olympics
Cyclists from Melbourne